Collin Delia (born June 20, 1994) is an American professional ice hockey goaltender for the  Vancouver Canucks of the National Hockey League (NHL). He previously played 32 games for the Chicago Blackhawks between 2018 and 2022, spending most of his time with the Rockford IceHogs in the American Hockey League.

Playing career
Delia grew up playing youth hockey in Southern California before moving to the Amarillo Bulls of the North American Hockey League (NAHL). In 2013, Delia committed to play Division 1 collegiate hockey with Merrimack College of the Hockey East.

In his freshman season with the Merrimack Warriors, Delia served as a backup goaltender and was limited to nine games. In his sophomore season, Delia played in 15 games before suffering an injury. He completed the season with 26 games, a new career-high 600 saves, and a .889 save percentage.

In his junior season, Delia started 21 games for the Merrimack Warriors, finishing the season with a new season high in wins and a 9-8-3 record. Afterwards, he was named to the Hockey East Third Team All-Star. Upon completing his junior season with the Warriors in the 2016–17 season, Delia left Merrimack in signing a two-year, entry-level contract with the Chicago Blackhawks on July 28, 2017.

During the 2017–18 season, Delia initially played with the Blackhawks' AHL and ECHL affiliates in the Rockford IceHogs and Indy Fuel. He was later recalled by the Blackhawks following an injury to starter Corey Crawford, serving as backup to Anton Forsberg. After Forsberg was injured in pregame warmups, Delia made his NHL debut on March 29, 2018 against the Winnipeg Jets. Delia himself was injured early in the third period, forcing Scott Foster, whom the Blackhawks had signed to an emergency one-day contract (NHL rules require every team to have a backup goaltender dressed), to play the last 14 minutes of the game, which the Blackhawks eventually won 6–2

Delia began the 2018–19 season with the IceHogs after attending the Blackhawks training camp. He was recalled in December after starter Corey Crawford suffered an injury. On February 11, 2019, the Blackhawks signed Delia to a three-year, $3 million contract extension. He was reassigned to the AHL on February 25 but was recalled again on March 5, on an emergency basis. After he helped the Blackhawks hold on for a 5–4 win over the Toronto Maple Leafs on March 13, Delia was reassigned to the IceHogs.

As a free agent from the Blackhawks after five seasons within the organization, Delia was signed to a one-year, $750,000 contract with the Vancouver Canucks on July 13, 2022.

Career statistics

Awards and honors

References

External links
 

1994 births
Living people
Abbotsford Canucks players
Amarillo Bulls players
American men's ice hockey goaltenders
Chicago Blackhawks players
Ice hockey players from California
Indy Fuel players
Merrimack Warriors men's ice hockey players
People from Rancho Cucamonga, California
Rockford IceHogs (AHL) players
Sportspeople from San Bernardino County, California
Undrafted National Hockey League players
Vancouver Canucks players